PMC MUSIC Launched on the 9th of May 2003 from Amsterdam, PMC has the passion and vision necessary to give Iranian youth a new voice. PMC is at the forefront of Iranian media and continues to expand its boundaries in content as well as coverage. With round-the-clock programming and a playlist that encompasses several popular musical genres, and a unique blend of Persian, Arabic, and Western Music, PMC has been able to extend its reach to an ever-expanding fan base. Its cutting-edge style has rapidly made it the most popular television channel in Iran. PMC represents an exciting new era in entertainment for Iranian youth. PMC is the first free-to-air satellite TV channel that directly and dynamically responds to the current needs of the younger generation of Iran. PMC broadcasts on the Hot-bird, Astra and Yah-live satellites for, Iran, the Middle East, Europe and North America. The latest research estimates indicate that PMC is available on 14 million receivers in Iran alone. 
With a viewership of more than 8 million daily. The new plans for 2023/24 upcoming channels PMC FAMILY and PMC SPORTS 

Founder & CEO of a Dutch Iranian entrepreneur: Mehrdad E Kia, living in the Netherlands, Wassenaar, since 1975 

PMC (shortened from Persian Media Corporation or Persian Music Channel) is a free-to-air satellite TV network owned by Persian Media Corporation with its headquarters in Luzern, Switzerland (formerly in Dubai Media City).[1] It was launched in 2003.[2] The network is devoted to Persian music videos[3] from ex-pat Iranian singers, as well as Iranian singers based in Iran.[4]
The channel is also widely viewed in Iran, Europe, the Middle East, and [[North America] via free-to-air satellite.
In March 2017, broadcasting via Hotbird was discontinued. In April 2017, PMC started a new broadcasting frequency via Astra.[5] In December 2017, the channel returned to Hotbird.[6] After the channel was only available on Yahsat for a while, it changed to Hotbird, Eutelsat 7A and Eutelsat 7B.

The channel is also widely viewed in Iran, Europe, Middle East, [[North America] via free-to-air satellite.PMC is also available on cable in Dubai, Qatar and other digital receivers.

https://www.facebook.com/mypmc
https://www.instagram.com/pmcmusic
https://twitter.com/mypmc

PMC Presentation
https://www.youtube.com/watch?v=nvqK_PcukqI

References

External links

Television stations in the United Arab Emirates
Persian-language television stations
Music television channels
Television channels and stations established in 2003
Mass media in Dubai
Music organisations based in Iran